Once in a New Moon is a 1935 British science fiction film directed by Anthony Kimmins and starring Eliot Makeham, René Ray and Morton Selten. It is a quota quickie, made at Shepperton Studios.

Plot
When a dead star passes planet Earth, its magnetic pull dislodges the (fictitious) English town of Shrimpton-on-the-Sea and causes it to break away and become its own miniature globe in orbit around the Earth. The village is now an island, the only land, and the rest of the mini planet is water which can be circumnavigated in a day. Sail straight and you eventually find the town again. The sun rises and sets every few hours and the Earth can be seen as a new moon in the sky. Otherwise, life is as before.

As panic sets in, the upper and lower classes of the village set about forming a new government. However, stubbornness, snobbery, distrust, paranoia and petty jealousy soon lead the population of the newly-named Shrimpton-in-Space to the brink of civil war.

Cast
 Eliot Makeham as Harold Drake  
 René Ray as Stella Drake  
 Morton Selten as Lord Bravington  
 Wally Patch as Syd Parrott  
 Derrick De Marney as Hon. Bryan-Grant  
 John Clements as Edward Teale  
 Mary Hinton as Lady Bravington  
 Gerald Barry as Col. Fitzgeorge  
 Richard Goolden as Rev. Benjamin Buffett  
 Harold Saxon-Snell as K. Pilkington-Bigge 
 John Turnbull as Capt. Crump 
 William Fazan
 Ralph Howard
 Franklyn Kelsey
 Vernon Kelso
 Cecil Landau
 Charles Paton
 Walter Roy
 Thorley Walters

References

Bibliography
 Low, Rachael. Filmmaking in 1930s Britain. George Allen & Unwin, 1985.
 Wood, Linda. British Films, 1927-1939. British Film Institute, 1986.

External links

1935 films
British science fiction films
Films directed by Anthony Kimmins
Films set in England
Quota quickies
Films shot at Shepperton Studios
1930s science fiction films
1930s English-language films
1930s British films